Paris By Night 101: Hạnh Phúc Đầu Năm is a Paris By Night program produced by Thúy Nga Productions that was filmed at Pechanga Resort and Casino, California on November 13 & 14, 2010. This is the fourth Paris by Night program celebrating Tết followed three previous editions:
Paris by Night 85: Xuân Trong Kỷ Niệm (2007),  Paris By Night 80: Tết Khắp Mọi Nhà (2006) and Paris by Night 76: Xuân Tha Hương (2005). The DVD was released on January 14, 2011.

Concept

The program is a part of "Thúy Nga Tết Quadrilogy" to celebrate Lunar New Year.  The other seven programs are Paris by Night 76: Xuân Tha Hương, Paris by Night 80: Tết Khắp Mọi Nhà, Paris by Night 85: Xuân Trong Kỷ Niệm, Paris By Night 110: Phát Lộc Đầu Năm, Paris By Night 113: Mừng Tuổi Mẹ, Paris By Night 124: Anh Cho Em Mùa Xuân, Paris By Night 131: Xuân Hy Vọng and Paris By Night 132: Xuân Với Đời Sống Mới.

Track list

Disc 1

01. Ngày Tết Việt Nam (Hoài An) - Tóc Tiên, Quỳnh Vi, Nguyệt Anh, Hương Giang, Diễm Sương, Kỳ Phương Uyên

02. Thư Xuân Hải Ngoại (Trầm Tử Thiêng) - Ngọc Hạ

03. Nghĩ Chuyện Ngày Xuân (Song Ngọc) - Mai Thiên Vân

04. Khúc Giao Mùa (Huy Tuấn) - Trịnh Lam, Lam Anh

05. Quê Hương Mùa Xuân (Tiến Luân) - Phi Nhung

06. Mộng Chiều Xuân (Ngọc Bích) - Thanh Hà / Phố Hoa (Hoài An) - Như Loan

07. Những Kiếp Hoa Xuân (Anh Bằng) - Hồ Lệ Thu / Cánh Hoa Xưa (Hoàng Trọng) - Khánh Ly

08. Giao Mùa (Võ Hoài Phúc) - Lưu Bích, Trần Quang Vũ

09. Người Tình Ơi! Mơ Gì (Nguyễn Tường Văn) - Mai Tiến Dũng & Tóc Tiên

10. Quê Tôi (Minh Vy) - Tú Quyên, Hương Giang, Diễm Sương

11. Liên Khúc:
 Trăng Về Thôn Dã (Hoài An, Huyền Linh)
 Rước Tình Về Với Quê Hương (Hoàng Thi Thơ)
- Thế Sơn, Hương Thủy

12. Chúc Xuân (Lữ Liên) - Việt Hương, Bé Tí, Thúy Nga

13. Hát Với Chú Ve Con (Thanh Tùng) - Minh Tuyết

14. Chân Tình (Trần Lê Quỳnh) - Lương Tùng Quang / Điệp Khúc Mùa Xuân (Quốc Dũng) - Thủy Tiên

Disc 2

15. Em Đã Thấy Mùa Xuân Chưa? (Quốc Dũng) - Khánh Hà

16. Giọt Café Đầu Tiên (Trần Thiện Thanh) - Mạnh Quỳnh & Trường Vũ

17. Tình Có Như Không (Trần Thiện Thanh) - Nguyễn Hưng

18. Hài Kịch: Đám Cưới Đầu Xuân (Nguyễn Ngọc Ngạn) - Chí Tài, Bé Tí, Hoài Tâm, Carol Kim, Tom Treutler

19. Xuân Đẹp Làm Sao (Thanh Sơn) - Như Quỳnh

20. Ngày Xuân Thăm Nhau (Hoài An, Trang Dũng Phương) - Duy Trường & Quỳnh Dung

21. Mùa Xuân Trên Đỉnh Bình Yên (Từ Công Phụng) - Quang Dũng

22. Xuân Với Đời Sống Mới (Tuấn Vũ) - Ngọc Anh

23. Nụ Cười Sơn Cước (Tô Hải) - Trần Thái Hòa

24. Nụ Xuân (Vũ Anh Hùng) - Quỳnh Vi, Nguyệt Anh

25. Bài Ca Tết Cho Em (Quốc Dũng) - Quang Lê

26. Ca Khúc Mừng Xuân (Văn Phụng) - Don Hồ, Kỳ Phương Uyên

Paris by Night